The 1992 Tulsa Golden Hurricane football team represented the University of Tulsa during the 1992 NCAA Division I-A football season. In their fifth year under head coach David Rader, the Golden Hurricane compiled a 4–7 record. The team's statistical leaders included quarterback Gus Frerotte with 1,467 passing yards, Lamont Headd with 827 rushing yards, and Gary Brown with 560 receiving yards.

Schedule

Roster

References

Tulsa
Tulsa Golden Hurricane football seasons
Tulsa Golden Hurricane football